Siirt Atatürk Stadium is a multi-purpose stadium in Siirt, Turkey.  It is currently used mostly for football matches and is the home ground of Siirtspor. The stadium was built in 1969 and currently holds 7000 people. With the promotion of Siirtspor to the Turkish Süper Lig at the end of the 1999–2000 season, the stadium was approved and expanded.

References

External links
World football travel
Xklsv.org

Football venues in Turkey
Multi-purpose stadiums in Turkey
Sports venues completed in 1969
1969 establishments in Turkey
Things named after Mustafa Kemal Atatürk